Nathaniel Lindley, Baron Lindley,  (29 November 1828 – 9 December 1921) was an English judge.

Early life
He was the second son of the botanist Dr. John Lindley, born at Acton Green, London. From his mother's side, he was descended from Sir Edward Coke. He was educated at University College School, and studied for a time at University College London, and the University of Edinburgh and University of Cambridge in 1898 and achieved Doctor of Civil Law in University of Oxford in 1903.

Legal career
He was called to the bar at the Middle Temple in 1850, and began practice in the Court of Chancery. In 1855 he published An Introduction to the Study of Jurisprudence, consisting of a translation of the general part of Thibaut's System des Pandekten Rechts, with copious notes. In 1860 he published in two volumes his Treatise on the Law of Partnership, including its Application to Joint Stock and other Companies, and in 1862 a supplement including the Companies Act 1862. This work has since been developed into two textbooks well known to lawyers as Lindley on Companies and Lindley on Partnership. Among his pupils were Francis William Maclean, later Chief Justice of Bengal, and Frederick Pollock.

He took silk in February 1872. In 1874 he was elected a bencher of the Middle Temple, of which he was treasurer in 1894

Judicial career
In 1875, he was appointed to be a Serjeant-at-law and a Justice of the Court of Common Pleas, the appointment of a chancery barrister to a common-law court being justified by the fusion of common law and equity then shortly to be brought about, in theory at all events, by the Judicature Acts.

In 1875, he was knighted. In 1880 he became a justice of the Queen's Bench and in 1881 he was raised to be a Lord Justice of the Court of Appeal and was sworn of the Privy Council.

In 1897, Lord Justice Lindley succeeded Lord Esher as Master of the Rolls, and in 1900 he was made a Lord of Appeal in Ordinary with a life peerage and the title of Baron Lindley, of East Carleton in the County of Norfolk. He resigned the judicial post in 1905.

Prior to the 1875 reforms, the appointment of serjeants-at-law had already declined, but common law judges could only be appointed from amongst the serjeants-at-law, so it was customary for any appointee who was not yet a serjeant to be appointed a serjeant immediately prior to being appointed a judge. As the requirement for common law judges to be serjeants was abolished shortly after, Lord Lindley became the last serjeant-at-law appointed, and the last judge to wear the serjeant's coif, or rather the black patch representing it, on the judicial wig.

Mount Lindley in Antarctica is named after him.

Family
He married Sarah Katharine, daughter of Edward John Teale of Leeds, on 5 Aug 1858. He died at home in East Carleton, near Norwich, in 1921. They had nine children, including diplomat Sir Francis Oswald Lindley and the army officer Major-General John Lindley.

Coat of arms

Writing
Lord Lindley published two notable works, Lindley on Companies and Lindley on Partnership. The latter is still published today, as Lindley and Banks on Partnership, now in its 20th edition (2017).

Cases

Company law
Allen v Gold Reefs of West Africa Ltd [1900] 1 Ch 656
 Illingworth v Houldsworth [1904] AC 355, on floating charges
Isle of Wight Rly Co v Tahourdin (1884) LR 25 Ch D 320 - a UK company law case on removing directors under the Companies Clauses Act 1845.
Salomon v A Salomon & Co Ltd [1897] AC 22

Contract law
Allcard v Skinner (1887) 36 Ch D 145
Byrne v Van Tienhoven [1880] 5 CPD 344
Carlill v Carbolic Smoke Ball Company [1892] EWCA Civ 1, [1893] 1 QB 256, [1892] 2 QB 484 (QBD) - an advertisement containing certain terms to get a reward constituted a binding unilateral offer that could be accepted by anyone who performed its terms.
Creen v Wright (1875–76) LR 1 CPD 591
Foakes v Beer (Lindley sitting in the Court of Appeal) [1884] UKHL 1, [1881-85] All ER Rep 106, (1884) 9 App Cas 605; 54 LJQB 130; 51 LT 833; 33 WR 233 - a leading case from the House of Lords on the legal concept of consideration
Parker v South Eastern Railway (1877) 2 CPD 416

Property
Colls v Home and Colonial Stores (1904)

Tort
Quinn v Leathem [1901] AC 495
Robinson v Kilvert (1889) LR 41 ChD 88

Trusts and equity
Speight v Gaunt (1883) 9 App Cas 1
In re Whiteley (1886) 33 Ch D 347, 355

Other
Knox v Gye (1872)
In re Addlestone Linoleum Co (1887) 37 Ch D 191
South Hetton Coal Co v Haswell, Shotton and Easington Coal and Coke Co [1898] 1 Ch. 465
Taff Vale Railway Co v Amalgamated Society of Railway Servants [1901] AC 426
Scottish Free Church case [1904] AC 515
Shepheard v Broome [1904] AC 342

Books
Nathaniel Lindley, An Introduction to the Study of Jurisprudence; Being a Translation of the General Part of Thibaut’s System des Pandekten Rechts (William Maxwell, 1855)

Notes

References
 
 

Attribution:

Further reading
.

External links

 
 

1828 births
1921 deaths
Law lords
20th-century English judges
People from Acton, London
People educated at University College School
Serjeants-at-law (England)
Members of the Middle Temple
Queen's Bench Division judges
Masters of the Rolls
Members of the Judicial Committee of the Privy Council
Fellows of the Royal Society
Justices of the Common Pleas
Common Pleas Division judges
Fellows of the British Academy
Members of the Privy Council of the United Kingdom
Knights Bachelor
Life peers created by Queen Victoria
19th-century English judges